A Man in Full is an upcoming American drama limited series starring Jeff Daniels and Diane Lane, and written by David E. Kelley and directed by Regina King based on Tom Wolfe's novel of the same name for Netflix. The series consists of six episodes, and will premiere on Netflix.

Premise 
Business and political interests collide when Atlanta real estate mogul Charlie Croker defends his empire from those wanting to capitalize on his sudden bankruptcy and fall from grace.

Cast and characters 
 Jeff Daniels as Charlie Croker
 Diane Lane as Martha Croker
 William Jackson Harper as Wes Jordan
 Aml Ameen as Roger White
 Tom Pelphrey as Raymond Peepgrass
 Sarah Jones as Serena Croker
 Jon Michael Hill as Conrad Hensley
 Chanté Adams as Jill Hensley
 Lucy Liu as Joyce Newman
 Bill Camp as Harry Zale
 Evan Roe as Wally Croker

Episodes 

Regina King will direct the first three episodes.

Production

Development 
On November 4, 2021, it was announced that Netflix had given a series order to A Man in Full, which is based on the novel of the same name by Tom Wolfe. The series is written by David E. Kelley and directed by Regina King. The two also executive produce along with Reina King and Matthew Tinker. The series is produced by Royal Ties Productions and David E. Kelley Productions.

Casting 
In early May 2022, Jeff Daniels was cast. Diane Lane was cast as the female lead in July 2022. William Jackson Harper, Aml Ameen, Tom Pelphrey, Sarah Jones, Jon Michael Hill, Chanté Adams, Lucy Liu, and Bill Camp joined the series in August 2022.

Filming 
Filming was previously set to begin in May 2022. Filming was expected to begin on August 8, 2022, in Atlanta, Georgia, and wrap on December 10.

References

External links 
 

American drama television series
American television miniseries
Television series based on American novels
Television series created by David E. Kelley
Television shows filmed in Atlanta
Television shows set in Atlanta
Upcoming drama television series
Upcoming Netflix original programming